Proceratium google, also known as the Google ant, was discovered in Madagascar by Brian L. Fisher, Associate Curator of Entomology at the California Academy of Sciences. The ant has an oddly shaped abdomen, adapted for hunting its exclusive meal of spider eggs.

Fisher named the ant after the search engine company Google Inc., as a tribute to the usefulness of Google Earth in his research. He wrote:

References

 Antweb (2005).  Species: Proceratium google. Retrieved September 30, 2005.
 California Academy of Sciences (2005). ACADEMY SCIENTIST MAPS WORLD'S ANTS WITH GOOGLE EARTH. Retrieved September 30, 2005.

Proceratiinae
Insects described in 2005
Hymenoptera of Africa
Insects of Madagascar
Google